Colin Stuart may refer to:

Colin Stuart (cricketer) (born 1973), Guyanese cricketer
Colin Stuart (ice hockey) (born 1982), American professional ice hockey winger

See also
Colin Stewart (disambiguation)